Ubiquitin-like modifier-activating enzyme 7 is a protein that in humans is encoded by the UBA7 gene.

The modification of proteins with ubiquitin is an important cellular mechanism for targeting abnormal or short-lived proteins for degradation. Ubiquitination involves at least three classes of enzymes: ubiquitin-activating enzymes, or E1s, ubiquitin-conjugating enzymes, or E2s, and ubiquitin-protein ligases, or E3s. This gene encodes a member of the E1 ubiquitin-activating enzyme family. The encoded enzyme is a retinoid target that triggers promyelocytic leukemia (PML)/retinoic acid receptor alpha (RARalpha) degradation and apoptosis in acute promyelocytic leukemia.

References

Further reading